
Year 435 (CDXXXV) was a common year starting on Tuesday (link will display the full calendar) of the Julian calendar. At the time, it was known as the Year of the Consulship of Theodosius and Valentinianus (or, less frequently, year 1188 Ab urbe condita). The denomination 435 for this year has been used since the early medieval period, when the Anno Domini calendar era became the prevalent method in Europe for naming years.

Events 
 By place 

 Roman Empire 
 Roman general (magister militum) Flavius Aetius begins a campaign in Gaul against the Burgundians, following their raids into neighbouring Gallia Belgica by King Gunther.
 November 14 – Emperor Theodosius II orders a new edict for the death penalty of all heretics and pagans in the Empire. Judaism is considered a legal non-Christian religion.

 Africa 

 King Genseric concludes a peace treaty with the Romans, under which the Vandals retain Mauretania and a part of Numidia as foederati (allies under a special treaty) of Rome.
 The Vandals use Hippo Regius (modern Annaba) as a port for their expeditions. Genseric establishes a merchant fleet to transport goods between Africa and the Italian mainland.
 Huneric, eldest son of Genseric, is sent as a child hostage to the court at Ravenna to secure the alliance with the Western Roman Empire.

 Central America 
 August 10 – A figure known to Mayanist scholars as "Casper" begins a 52-year reign in the Mayan city-state of Palenque what is now the state of Chiapas in southern Mexico, and reigns until his death in 487.
 December 8 – On the Mayan calendar, the era of the 9th Baktun begins.  There is a change in political alliances just preceding the event when royal personages from the Mexican highland city of Teotihuacan consolidate power individually as Mayan kings.

 By topic 

 Religion 
 August 3 – Theodosius II exiles Nestorius, archbishop of Constantinople, to a monastery in the Libyan desert at the behest of his sister Pulcheria.
 Ibas is elected bishop of Edessa. He becomes associated with the growth of Nestorianism and openly preaching heretical doctrines in public.

 Births 

 Deaths 
 John Cassian, Desert Father and theologian
 Pelagius, British monk (approximate date)
 Philip of Side, Christian church historian (approximate date)
 Rabbula, bishop of Edessa

References